Andrew Gromov is a Russian bridge player.

Bridge accomplishments

Wins 

 North American Bridge Championships (6)
 Keohane North American Swiss Teams (1) 2009 
 Mitchell Board-a-Match Teams (3) 2000, 2009, 2010 
 Spingold (1) 2008 
 Vanderbilt (1) 2001

Runners-up 

 North American Bridge Championships (4)
 Mitchell Board-a-Match Teams (1) 2007 
 Reisinger (1) 2013 
 Roth Open Swiss Teams (1) 2012 
 Spingold (1) 2007

Notes

External links 

Russian contract bridge players
Living people
Year of birth missing (living people)